Robert Mercer (born 1946) is an American computer scientist and former co-CEO of the hedge fund Renaissance Technologies.

Robert or Bob Mercer may also refer to:

 Bob Mercer (footballer) (1889–1926), Scottish footballer (Heart of Midlothian FC and Scotland).
 Bob Mercer (politician) (active 1993–2009), Canadian politician.
 Robert Mercer (priest) (born 1935), English priest.
 Robert Mercer Johnston (1908–1984), Canadian politician.
 Robbie Mercer, fictional character in Scream 4 (2011).

See also
 Bobby Murcer (1946–2008), American Major League Baseball player.